Stephen Albert Fulling (born 29 April 1945, Evansville, Indiana) is an American mathematician and mathematical physicist, specializing in the mathematics of quantum theory, general relativity, and the spectral and asymptotic theory of differential operators. He is known for preliminary work that led to the discovery of the hypothetical Unruh effect (also known as 
the Fulling-Davies-Unruh effect).

Education and career
After secondary education at Missouri's Lindbergh High School, Fulling graduated in 1967 with A.B. in physics from Harvard University. At Princeton University he became a graduate student in physics and received M.S. in 1969 and Ph.D. in 1972. His thesis Scalar Quantum Field Theory in a Closed Universe of Constant Curvature was supervised by Arthur Wightman. Fulling was a postdoc from 1972 to 1974 at the University of Wisconsin-Milwaukee and from 1974 to 1976 at King’s College London. At Texas A&M University he joined the mathematics faculty in 1976 and was promoted to full professor in 1984. In addition to mathematics, he holds a joint appointment in physics and astronomy.

In 2018 Fulling was elected a fellow of the American Physical Society. He has also been elected a foreign member of the Royal Society of Sciences in Uppsala.

Selected publications

Books

Articles

See also 

 Differential operator
 Fulling–Davies–Unruh effect
 General relativity
 Mathematical formulation of quantum mechanics
 Quantum Field Theory

References

External links 

 Oral history interview transcript with Stephen Fulling on 8 July 2021, American Institute of Physics, Niels Bohr Library & Archives

1945 births
Living people
20th-century American mathematicians
21st-century American mathematicians
20th-century American physicists
21st-century American physicists
Mathematical physicists
Harvard College alumni
Princeton University alumni
Texas A&M University faculty
Fellows of the American Physical Society
People from Evansville, Indiana
Mathematicians from Missouri
Physicists from Missouri